The Bloody Angle refers to a section of the Battle Road, in Lincoln, Massachusetts, on which two battles were fought on April 19, 1775, during the battles of Lexington and Concord in the first stage of the American Revolutionary War.

Route 
The route deemed to be the Battle Road falls completely within today's Minute Man National Historic Park.

The following points of interest are located along the road (from west to east, to align with the timeline of events of April 19, 1775) in the immediate build-up to the battle at Bloody Angle.

Meriam's Corner (Lexington Road and Old Bedford Road), Concord
Site of the first confrontation between the colonial militia and the British column. The skirmishes continued for the next eighteen miles. (12.30 PM)

Grave of British soldiers
Nathan Meriam House

Lexington Road, Concord
Farwell Jones House 
Stow-Hardy House 
Samuel Brooks House 

Route 2A (North Great Road), Lincoln

Brooks Hill (12.45 PM)
Noah Brooks Tavern 
Job Brooks House 
Joshua Brooks House 

The regulars soon reached a point in the road, now referred to as the "Bloody Angle", where the road rises and curves sharply to the left through a lightly wooded area. At this place, the militia company from Woburn had positioned themselves on the southeast side of the bend in the road in a rocky, lightly wooded field. Additional militia flowing parallel to the road from the engagement at Meriam's Corner positioned themselves on the northwest side of the road, catching the British in a crossfire, while other militia companies on the road closed from behind to attack. Some  further along, the road took another sharp curve, this time to the right, and again the British column was caught by another large force of militiamen firing from both sides. In passing through these two sharp curves, the British force lost thirty soldiers killed or wounded, and four colonial militia were also killed, including Captain Jonathan Wilson of Bedford, Captain Nathan Wyman of Billerica, Lt. John Bacon of Natick, and Daniel Thompson of Woburn. The British soldiers escaped by breaking into a trot, a pace that the colonials could not maintain through the woods and swampy terrain. Colonial forces on the road itself behind the British were too densely packed and disorganized to mount more than a harassing attack from the rear.

As militia forces from other towns continued to arrive, the colonial forces had risen to about 2,000 men. The road now straightened to the east, with cleared fields and orchards along the sides. Lieutenant Colonel Francis Smith sent out flankers again, who succeeded in trapping some militia from behind and inflicting casualties. British casualties were also mounting from these engagements and from persistent long-range fire from the militiamen, and the exhausted British were running out of ammunition.

References

Bloody Angle
Bloody Angle
Bloody Angle
18th century in Boston
Lincoln, Massachusetts
1775 in the Thirteen Colonies
Conflicts in 1775
1775 in Massachusetts
Military history of New England
American Revolutionary War sites in Massachusetts